Soy Luna is an Argentine-Mexican drama television series developed by Disney Channel Latin America. The series premiered on 14 March 2016 in Latin America on Disney Channel, and is currently in its third season.

Character appearances 
Legend
 = Main cast (credited)
 = Recurring cast (2+)
 = Guest cast (1)

Main characters

Luna Valente 
Portrayed by Karol Sevilla, Luna Valente is the titular character, she is a sweet and kind girl from Mexico. Luna loves her family and friends. With talent and determination, Luna can do anything she puts to her mind. She is the daughter of Lili Benson and Bernie Benson, but was adopted by Monica Valente and Miguel Valente.

Matteo Balsano 
Portrayed by Ruggero Pasquarelli, Matteo Balsano he is one of the main characters. Matteo is a very presumptuous, and superficial boy. He is a very good skater, reason why they give him the nickname "El Rey de la Pista", when he meets Luna Valente he falls madly in love with her and looks for how to always approach her. Matteo is very intelligent and uses his intelligence to help Luna with her problems. Many times he behaves like a superficial boy, but inside he has a good heart.

Ámbar Smith 
Portrayed by Valentina Zenere, Ámbar Smith she is one of the main characters and the main antagonist of the show. She is superficial and capricious, but also very intelligent. Ámbar is the type of girl that catches everyone's attention and is very popular. She will do anything to get what she wants. When trying to get what she wants, Ámbar is a manipulative girl. Despite all this, although she does not want to admit it, she is jealous of Luna's relationship with her parents, since her parents travel a lot, and barely speaks to her godmother.

Simón Álvarez 
Portrayed by Michael Ronda, Simón Álvarez he is one of the main characters. Simón is a guy who loves to skate and play guitar, he used to work at Foodger Wheels, a fast food restaurant with his best friend Luna, but when Luna's parents decide to leave Cancun, Mexico. Because they are hired to work at the Benson Mansion in Buenos Aires, Argentina, he says goodbye to Luna. But then he decides to go to Buenos Aires where he will become a member of La Roller Band, formed by Nicolás and Pedro, form a rivalry with Matteo Balsano, and enroll in the Skating Competition at the Jam and Roller.

Delfina Alzamendi 
Portrayed by Malena Rather , Delfina Alzamendi she is one of the main characters. She is one of the best friends of Ámbar Smith and Jazmín Carvajal, like Jazmín, she is the owner, creator and editor of the Fab And Chic website. Like her friends, she is superficial and capable of doing whatever she wants in order to achieve what she plans. Delfina or "Delfi" in spite of beginning to be a totally capricious girl, prejudiced and often petty, she actually has a nice personality in the background that is overshadowed by her loyalty to Ámbar that does not let her make her own decisions. Change attitude by the advice of Pedro becoming a determined, sensible, capable cute baby sweet girl.

Gastón Perida 
Portrayed by Agustín Bernasconi, Gastón Perida he is one of the main characters. Gastón is nice, but also very safe. He respects everyone, but sometimes he gets upset and gets angry. His main interests are skating and music. He loves books, especially science fiction books. Despite being one of the most popular is good vibes. He is Matteo's best friend.

Jazmín Carbajal 
Portrayed by Katja Martínez, Jazmín Carbajal she is one of the main characters. Jazmín is very different from her friends, Amber and Delphine. Jazmín has no filters and will tell you her opinion, whether she wants to or not. She is very naive and ignorant of what is happening around her. She follows all of Ámbar's plans blindly. Jazmín lives outside social networks and craves the opinion of others. It is very aware of fashion and follows all trends therefore it is very unoriginal and at the same time silly.

Jimena Medina 
Portrayed by Ana Jara, Jimena Medina she is one of the main characters. Jim is a friendly, sweet girl, with many ideas, impulsive and creative. She loves to sing and skate but her first passion is to choreograph routines. She and her best friend Yam are inseparable.

Ramiro Ponce 
Portrayed by Jorge López, Ramiro Ponce he is one of the main characters. Ramiro is an arrogant and proud boy who loves to dance and skate. He wants to do everything right, and when he can not, he gets too frustrated. He can not admit his mistakes, and he tries to blame others for it, but nevertheless he sometimes shows that he has a big heart in front of others. In the eyes of other people it can be seen as arrogant and unfriendly. Ramiro dreams of being a star, and works hard, hoping that one day his dream will come true.

Yamila Sánchez 
Portrayed by Chiara Parravicini, Yamila Sánchez she is one of the main characters. Yam is a 16-year-old girl, who studies at Blake South College and usually goes to Jam & Roller. She competed with Ramiro in a skating competition and participated several times in the Open Music with her best friend Jim.

Pedro Arias 
Portrayed by Gastón Vietto, Pedro Arias he is one of the main characters. Pedro is an employee of the Jam and Roller, he was secretly in love with Tamara and is currently in love with Delfina. His best friends are Nico and Simón.

Nicolás Navarro 

Portrayed by Lionel Ferro, Nicolás Navarro or Nico he is one of the main characters. Nicolás is the warm, buyer and friendly guy, with whom everyone quickly becomes attached. He is in charge of the skates in the Jam & Roller. Nico is Pedro's best friend, who also works on the skating rink. Together, they dream of forming a band and, little by little, they will get it.

Nina Simonetti 
Portrayed by Carolina Kopelioff, Nina Simonetti is one of the main characters. Nina is a very curious and intelligent girl, but also very reserved, shy, and unsure of herself due to her experiences with her parents' divorce. In the start of the show she doesn't know how to skate and has few friends. She meets Luna Valente and they became best friends and Luna starts to crack her out of her shell. Nina is in love with Gastón Perida, but doesn't think he will ever notice her.  Despite her shyness, she starts showing her true self through her Felicity For Now account, where she writes inspirational quotes.

Tamara Ríos 
Portrayed by Luz Cipriota, She is one of the main characters in the season one. Tamara is in charge of the Jam & Roller. She is very organized and responsible.

Sharon Benson 
Portrayed by Lucila Gandolfo, she is one of the main characters. She is a rich, sophisticated, and intelligent businesswoman she is Ámbar's adoptive mother and the maternal aunt of Luna.

Reinaldo Guitiérrez 
Portrayed by Rodrigo Pedreira, Reinaldo Guitiérrez or Rey is one of the main characters. He is a hardworking man and the personal assistant of Mrs. Sharon Benson. He often acts with a serious personality, especially with the employees of the mansion.

Miguel Valente 
Portrayed by David Murí, he is one of the main characters. Miguel is a kind and hardworking person. He always cares a lot about his wife, Mónica, and his daughter, Luna. He only wants the best for Luna and is at his side whenever he needs it. He is also very focused on his work at the Benson Mansion, and does what he is asked to do. He is also very honest and generous towards his family.

Recurring characters

Mariano 
Portrayed by Tomás de las Herás, Mariano he is Tamara's ex-boyfriend. He will bring many problems to the boys, deconcentrating them in the rehearsals for the Intercontinental competition and creating rivalry between them. He is a mysterious man and has bad intentions, he will try to get Jim and Ramiro to leave the team, as well as Luna, but he does not succeed. In the end he trains another team and loses the Intercontinental skating.

Guest stars

Introduced in season one
 Santiago Stieben as Arcade
 Dani Martins as himself
 Mirta Wons as Olga
 Leo Trento as Willy Star
 Sofia Carson as herself
 Sebastian Villalobos as himself
 Sol Moreno as Daniela

Introduced in season two
 Sabrina Carpenter as herself
 Martina Stoessel as herself
 Camila Fernández as herself

Introduced in season three
 Sofia Carson as herself
 Dove Cameron as herself
 Juan Ciancio as Sebastián "Seba" López
 Ian Lucas as himself

Notes

References 

Soy Luna
Soy Luna
Soy Luna